Haeckelites are three-fold coordinated networks of carbon atoms generated by a periodic arrangement of pentagons, hexagons and heptagons. They were first proposed by Humberto and Mauricio Terrones and their colleagues in 2000. They were named in honour of Ernst Haeckel, whose diagrams of radiolaria contained similar structural features. They have not yet been synthesised in the laboratory, but have been the subject of a considerable amount of theoretical work.

References 

Tessellation
Allotropes of carbon